Novoshumnoye is a village located in the Fyodorov District of Kostanay Region in northern Kazakhstan. Population:

References 

Populated places in Kostanay Region